The coat of arms of Belfast, now capital of Northern Ireland, was granted officially on 30 June 1890, although it has been used from 1643.

Overview
The coat of arms of the city is blazoned as Party per fesse argent and azure, in chief a pile vair and on a canton gules a bell argent, in base a ship with sails set argent on waves of the sea proper. This heraldic language describes a shield that is divided in two horizontally (party per fesse). The top (chief) of the shield is silver (argent), and has a point-down triangle (a pile) with a repeating blue-and-white pattern that represents fur (vair). There is also a red square in the top corner (a canton gules) on which there is a silver bell. It is likely that the bell is an example here of "canting" (or punning) heraldry, representing the first syllable of Belfast. In the lower part of the shield (in base) there is a silver sailing ship shown sailing on waves coloured in the actual colours of the sea (proper). The supporter on the "dexter" side (that is, the viewer's left) is a chained wolf, while on the "sinister" side the supporter is a sea-horse. The crest above the shield is also a sea-horse.

In the lower part, the coat of arms has the Latin motto "" in black on a white tape. This is taken from Psalm 116 Verse 12 in the Latin Vulgate Bible (Quid retribuam Domino pro omnibus quæ retribuit mihi?) and is literally "For (Pro) so much (tanto) what (quid) shall we repay (retribuamus)" The verse has been translated in bibles differently – for example as "What shall I render unto the Lord for all his benefits toward me?". It is also translated as "In return for so much, what shall we give back?"

These arms date back to 1613, when King James I granted Belfast town status. The seal was used by Belfast merchants throughout the 17th century on their signs and trade-coins. A large stained glass window in the City Hall displays the arms, where an explanation suggests that the seahorse and the ship refer to Belfast's significant maritime history. The wolf may be a tribute to the city's founder, Sir Arthur Chichester, and refer to his own coat of arms.

The elements that make up the arms of Belfast also appear on its flag.

Gallery

References

1890 introductions
1890 establishments in Ireland
Coats of arms of Northern Ireland
Culture in Belfast
History of Belfast